Patrick Ouchène (born 5 December 1966) is a Belgian singer, best known for being the lead singer of the rockabilly band Runnin' Wild.

Eurovision 2009
On 17 February he was chosen internally to represent Belgium at the Eurovision Song Contest 2009 in Moscow, Russia, with the song "Copycat". And on 10 March he was officially revealed as the choice for Belgium in Moscow, Patricks entry was also for the first time released. The song missed out on the final, finishing second-last  (17th) with only one point.

References

Living people
Belgian male singers
Eurovision Song Contest entrants for Belgium
Eurovision Song Contest entrants of 2009
French-language singers of Belgium
English-language singers from Belgium
1966 births